Poughkeepsie Meeting House (Montgomery Street) is a historic meeting house at 112 Montgomery Street in Poughkeepsie, New York.

It was built in 1863 for the Society of Friends (Quakers). The building was sold to the Temple Beth El, a local Jewish synagogue in 1927. The building was added to the National Register of Historic Places in 1989.

References

Churches on the National Register of Historic Places in New York (state)
Churches completed in 1863
Churches in Poughkeepsie, New York
Quaker meeting houses in New York (state)
Former synagogues in New York (state)
Former Quaker meeting houses in the United States
Religious organizations established in 1863
19th-century Quaker meeting houses
1863 establishments in New York (state)
National Register of Historic Places in Poughkeepsie, New York